Paul William Lawson (born 15 May 1984) is a Scottish professional footballer and manager who plays (as a central midfielder) and previously managed Formartine United in the Highland Football League. He has previously played for Celtic, St Johnstone, St Mirren, Ross County and Motherwell.

Club career

Celtic
Born in Aberdeen, Lawson began his career at Celtic where he was captain of the reserves side, and was a regular for the Scotland national under-21 football team. On 5 December 2005, Lawson signed a contract with Celtic, until 2008.

Lawson played at right-back for Celtic in pre-season of 2006–07 against teams such as Manchester United and on the first game of the season in the 4–1 defeat of Kilmarnock which put them top of the league.

Loan Spell
Lawson spent the first half of the 2006–07 season on loan at Scottish First Division club St Johnstone, scoring his first professional goal against Queen of the South. He returned to Parkhead in December 2006. After being an unused substitute in Celtic's 2–0 defeat of Kilmarnock on 2 January 2007, Lawson completed a second loan move, this time to St Mirren.

Ross County
Lawson was released by Celtic in the summer of 2007, and he then signed for Ross County on 31 August 2007. He made his debut in the second round of the Scottish Challenge Cup, in a 2–0 loss against St Johnstone. Two weeks later, on 15 September 2007, he made his league debut in a 2–0 win over Raith Rovers. On 5 January 2008, Lawson then received a red card during a 1–0 win against Raith Rovers. On 23 February 2008, Lawson scored a "stunning strike", his first goal for the club, in a 3–2 win over Queen's Park. After the match, Lawson said he hadn't experienced scoring enough to know how to celebrate. In the final game of the season, Lawson scored again, in a 4–0 win over Berwick Rangers. Lawson Made 28 appearances scored twice during his first season with the club. During the season, Ross County won promotion to the First Division after winning the Second Division

Lawson's second season at Ross County was frustrating due to his own injury concerns and the fact that his contract was due to expire at the end of the season. Lawson signed a one-year deal with the club in May 2009.

While in his third season, Lawson would regain his form and also his first team place. He scored six times, against Greenock Morton, Partick Thistle, Dundee, Dunfermline Athletic (twice) and Berwick Rangers. This was his highest goal tally in a season. In mid-December 2009, Lawson signed a new two-year deal with the club. During the season, Lawson was in the squad throughout Ross County's campaign in the Scottish Cup with the club reaching the final after beating Celtic in the semi-final. A year later, Lawson said he felt he wasn't really involved in that match having only on as a substitute in the last minute. In the Scottish Cup Final, Ross County lost 3–0 against Dundee United with Lawson coming on as a substitute for Steven Craig.

In the 2010–11 season, Lawson would retain his first team place and would make 27 appearances, scoring once against Partick Thistle on 16 April 2011. Lawson was in the squad when Ross County won 2–0 against Queen of the South to win the Challenge Cup. Lawson continued to retain his first team place, the next season, making 37 appearances and scoring twice, this season, against Ayr United and Raith Rovers. During the season, Ross County gained promotion to the Scottish Premier League after winning the 2011–12 Scottish First Division. At the end of the season, Lawson was offered a new deal to stay for the next season, he signed a one-year deal with the club in May 2015.

With the club now in the SPL, Lawson played his first match in the league, in a 0–0 against Motherwell in the opening game of the season. Lawson featured less at the start of the season, having been injured and struggled make it back to the first team. He then earned his first team place back. Lawson scored his first SPL goal, in a 2–0 win over Dundee on 8 February 2013, followed with his second in the Highland derby against Inverness Caledonian Thistle, which Ross County lost 2–1. After the match, Lawson stated scoring in the derby didn't count for anything in the end due to the defeat.

During his time in Dingwall, Lawson appeared in the 2010 Scottish Cup Final, won the 2011–12 Scottish First Division and helped the Staggies to a top-six finish in their first ever season in the 2012–13 SPL.

Motherwell
Lawson signed with Motherwell on 1 June 2013, at the end of his contract with Ross County.

Lawson made his Motherwell debut in the first leg of the third round of Europa League, in a 2–0 loss against Kuban Krasnodar. Motherwell would be eliminated after Kuban Krasnodar proved to be too strong and failed to win either legs losing 2–0 and 1–0 respectively. Lawson then made his league debut in the opening game of the season, in a 1–0 win over Hibernian. However, Lawson's first season at Motherwell didn't go well, due to playing less from the substitution and his own injury concern that kept him out for the remainder of the season. Lawson went on to make twenty-two appearances in all competitions.

Following his recovery in time for the pre-season friendly, Lawson played his first game since recovering from an injury, in a 1–0 loss against St Johnstone on 30 August 2014. Lawson's appearance was soon short-lived after just three appearances when he suffered injuries that kept him out for the remainder of the season once again.

On 2 June 2015, he was released by the club at the end of his contract.

Formartine United

On 6 July 2015 Lawson signed for Formartine United on a three-year contract.

In September 2017 he was appointed as player/manager of the club, with Russell Anderson his assistant. 

Lawson resigned on the 13th of March 2022 along with Assistant Manager Russell Anderson by mutual consent with the club.

Personal life
His brother-in-law is former Aberdeen captain Russell Anderson (Anderson is married to Lawson's sister), and he was an Aberdeen fan while growing up, along with his family.

Honours

Ross County
Second Division
2010–11 Scottish Challenge Cup
2011–12 Scottish First Division

Individual
Scottish First Division Player of the Month: January 2010

References

External links
 Paul Lawson profile at Motherwell FC official website

1984 births
Living people
Footballers from Aberdeen
Ross County F.C. players
Scotland under-21 international footballers
Scottish Football League players
Scottish footballers
Scottish Premier League players
Celtic F.C. players
St Johnstone F.C. players
St Mirren F.C. players
Motherwell F.C. players
Association football midfielders
Scottish Professional Football League players
Formartine United F.C. players
Highland Football League players
Scottish football managers